Daniel Robbins is a computer programmer and consultant best known as the founder and former chief architect of the Gentoo Linux project. In 2008, he launched the Funtoo project, a free Linux distribution based on Gentoo, and he became the project's lead developer and organizer. He works in Albuquerque, New Mexico at Zenoss, and as president for Funtoo Technologies.

Biography

Formation of Gentoo Linux distribution 
During his time as a system administrator at the University of New Mexico in Albuquerque, Robbins formed his own distribution Enoch Linux, which was later renamed Gentoo Linux in 2002.

However, like many other free software projects, Gentoo struggled to create a business model which would support its key developers. Robbins resigned as Chief Architect on 26 April 2004, citing considerable personal debt, and a desire to spend more time with his family, formed the Gentoo Foundation and transferred all Gentoo intellectual property to it, so that Gentoo is now run as a full community-based model. He did rejoin the project for a short time from August 2006, becoming a developer again in February 2007 and joining the amd64 team but resigned in early March 2007.

There have been several high-profile criticisms of the way Gentoo has run since Robbins left, such as: "...since the resignation of Gentoo's founder and benevolent dictator from the project in 2004, the newly established Gentoo Foundation has been battling with lack of clear directions and frequent developer conflicts...", but in mid-July 2007 it emerged that Robbins was still technically the legal president of the Gentoo Foundation:

...I would like to see more fun in Gentoo, and a lot less politics, and in my apparent role as President of the Gentoo Foundation, I may have an opportunity to change things for the better. I will need to look into this more...

Funtoo Linux
In 2008, Robbins began to work on Funtoo, a project created to allow him to work on extending the technologies originally created for Gentoo.

Microsoft 
Robbins' move to Microsoft, in May 2005, attracted attention within the Linux community, which has historically had a combative relationship with Microsoft. He described his role working for Bill Hilf as "...helping Microsoft to understand Open Source and community-based projects..."

However, Robbins resigned less than a year later on 16 January 2006 due to frustrations that he was unable to fully utilize his technical skills in this position.

RTLinux
Later in 2006, he joined FSMLabs in Socorro, New Mexico, to work on RTLinux.

Funtoo Technologies

Daniel Robbins is also president of Funtoo Technologies, a consulting firm founded in 2006 and located in Albuquerque, New Mexico.

References

External links
 Linux Crazy podcast featuring an interview with Daniel Robbins

Living people
University of New Mexico staff
Anglophone Quebec people
American computer programmers
Canadian emigrants to the United States
Free software programmers
Linux people
People from Montreal
Gentoo Linux people
Worcester Polytechnic Institute alumni
Year of birth missing (living people)